The following outline is provided as an overview of and topical guide to Jharkhand:

Jharkhand –  state in eastern India carved out of the southern part of Bihar on 15 November 2000. The state shares its border with the states of Bihar to the north, Uttar Pradesh and Chhattisgarh to the west, Odisha to the south, and West Bengal to the east. It has an area of 79,710 km2 (30,778 sq mi). The city of Ranchi is its capital while the industrial city of Jamshedpur is the most populous city of the state.

General reference

Names 
 Common English name: Jharkhand
 Pronunciation: 
 Official English name(s): Jharkhand
 Nickname(s): 
 Adjectival(s): Jharkhandi
 Demonym(s): Jharkhandis

Rankings (amongst India's states) 

 by population: 14th
 by area (2011 census): 16th
 by crime rate (2015): 23rd
 by gross domestic product (GDP) (2014): 17th
by Human Development Index (HDI): 
by life expectancy at birth: 
by literacy rate:

Geography of Jharkhand 

Geography of Jharkhand
 Jharkhand is: an Indian state
 Population of Jharkhand: 32,988,134 (2011)
 Area of Jharkhand: 79,714 km2 (30,778 sq mi)
 Atlas of Jharkhand

Location of Jharkhand 
 Jharkhand is situated within the following regions:
 Northern Hemisphere
 Eastern Hemisphere
 Eurasia
 Asia
 South Asia
 Indian subcontinent
 India
 East India
 Time zone:  Indian Standard Time (UTC+05:30)

it consist of a forest cover of almost 30% of its total geographical area.

Betla national park palamu is its lone national park and palamu tiger reserve its lone tiger reserve.

Regions of Jharkhand

Ecoregions of Jharkhand

Administrative divisions of Jharkhand 
Five administrative division of Jharkhand states-Palamu, North Chhotanagpur, South Chhotanagpur, Kolhan, Santhal Pargana.

Districts of Jharkhand 
24 district in jharkhand.
 Districts of Jharkhand

Municipalities of Jharkhand 

 Cities of Jharkhand
 Capital of Jharkhand: Capital of Jharkhand

According to the census 2011 Jharkhand has a total population of 3.2 crore. Hindu consist of 68% of the total population. Islam is then followed by 14% of the population. Sarnaism and Christianity is followed by 13% and 4% respectively.

Government and politics of Jharkhand 

Politics of Jharkhand

 Form of government: Indian state government (parliamentary system of representative democracy)
 Capital of Jharkhand: Ranchi
Jharkhand State Capitol
Political Party strength in Jharkhand
 Elections in Jharkhand

Union government in Jharkhand 
 Rajya Sabha members from Jharkhand
 Jharkhand Pradesh Congress Committee
 Indian general election, 2009 (Jharkhand)
Jharkhand Legislative Assembly

Branches of the government of Jharkhand 

Government of Jharkhand

Executive branch of the government of Jharkhand 

 Head of state: Governor of Jharkhand, 
 Head of government: Chief Minister of Jharkhand,

Legislative branch of the government of Jharkhand 

Jharkhand Legislative Assembly

Judicial branch of the government of Jharkhand 
Jharkhand High Court

Law and order in Jharkhand 
Cannabis in Jharkhand

Capital Punishment in Jharkhand

Constitution of India

Crime in Jharkhand

Prisons in Jharkhand

Law enforcement in Jharkhand
Jharkhand Police

History of Jharkhand 

History of Jharkhand

History of Jharkhand, by period

Prehistoric Jharkhand

Ancient Jharkhand

Medieval Jharkhand

Colonial Jharkhand

Contemporary Jharkhand

History of Jharkhand, by region

History of Jharkhand, by subject

Culture of Jharkhand 

Culture of Jharkhand
 Architecture of Jharkhand
 Cuisine of Jharkhand
 Monuments in Jharkhand
 Monuments of National Importance in Jharkhand
 State Protected Monuments in Jharkhand
 World Heritage Sites in Jharkhand

Art in Jharkhand 

 Music of Jharkhand

People of Jharkhand 

 People from Jharkhand

Religion in Jharkhand 

Religion in Jharkhand
 Christianity in Jharkhand

Sports in Jharkhand 

Sports in Jharkhand
 Cricket in Jharkhand
 Jharkhand Cricket Association
 Jharkhand cricket team
 Football in Jharkhand
 Jharkhand football team

Symbols of Jharkhand 

Symbols of Jharkhand
 State animal: elephant 
 State bird: koel
 State flower: palash
 State seal: ashok chakra with four daggers
 State tree: saal/ sakhua

Economy and infrastructure of Jharkhand 

Economy of Jharkhand
 Tourism in Jharkhand

Education in Jharkhand 

Education in Jharkhand
 Institutions of higher education in Jharkhand

Health in Jharkhand 

Health in Jharkhand

See also 

 Outline of India

References

External links 

 
 Dhanbad District Of Jharkhand – An Official Website

.
Jharkhand
Jharkhand